Shouldham Priory was a priory in the village of Shouldham, Norfolk, England.

Burials at this priory
William FitzGeoffrey de Mandeville, 3rd Earl of Essex
Geoffrey Fitz Peter, 1st Earl of Essex
Aveline de Clare, Countess of Essex
Robert de Montalt (1270/74 -1329), Steward of Chester

References

 "House of Gilbertines - The priory of Shouldham", A History of the County of Norfolk: Volume 2 (1906) pp. 412–414;  Available at http://www.british-history.ac.uk/report.aspx?compid=38298

Monasteries in Norfolk
Gilbertine monasteries